Platt Island is an archaeological site off Florida State Road 29 in Collier County north of Miles City. It was added to the U.S. National Register of Historic Places in 1978. Ceramic fragments dated to about 2500 years old were found at the site, which is in the Big Cypress National Preserve.

References

External links
 Collier County listings at National Register of Historic Places
 Collier County listings at Florida's Office of Cultural and Historical Programs

National Register of Historic Places in Big Cypress National Preserve
Archaeological sites in Florida
National Register of Historic Places in Collier County, Florida